Salix sitchensis is a species of willow known by the common name Sitka willow.

It is native to northwestern North America from Alaska to northern California to Montana.

It is a common to abundant plant in many types of coastal and inland wetland habitat, such as marshes, riverbanks, swamps, coastal sand dunes, and mountain springs.

Description
The leaves are up to 12 cm long, lance-shaped or oval with pointed tips, smooth-edged or toothed, often with the edges rolled under. The undersides are hairy to woolly in texture, and the upper surfaces are mostly hairless and dark green.

The inflorescence is a catkin of flowers, slender or short and stout. Male catkins are up to 6 cm long and female catkins are longer, sometimes exceeding 10 cm as the fruits develop.  The bloom period is March in California.

External links
 Jepson Manual eFlora (TJM2) treatment of Salix sitchensis
 OregonFlora
 Washington Burke Museum

Databases
 
 
 

sitchensis
Flora of Alaska
Flora of California
Flora of the Northwestern United States
Flora of Western Canada
Flora without expected TNC conservation status